This is a list of countries by vegetable production in 2020 based on the Food and Agriculture Organization Corporate Statistical Database. The total world vegetableproduction for 2020 was 1,148,446,252 metric tonnes.

In 1961 production was 198 mln. tonnes.

Production by country 
The table shows the countries with the largest production of vegetables (lettuce, lentil, beans, onion, chickpea, pulses, eggplant, cauliflower, broccoli, spinach, potato, cassava, soybean, carrot, cucumber, ginger, repeseed, yams, sweet potato, sesame, okra).

World production

References 
		

Lists of countries by production
vegetable